The Best Secret GmbH, a subsidiary of Schustermann & Borenstein GmbH, is an e-commerce company for designer merchandise based in Dornach (near Munich), Germany. Best Secret functions as a closed shopping community.

History 
The beginning of Schustermann & Borenstein date back to 1924.  The traditional family-run business is run by the third generation. Best Secret was founded as a subsidiary of Schustermann & Borenstein in 2007 to create an online presence.

Business Model 
Best Secret’s works as a closed shopping community. This means that the offers are only available to registered members and these members have access to a selection of permanently reduced designer merchandise. In order to maintain this pricing policy and yet protect the exclusivity of the brands, access to the online store is limited to 250,000 members. A prospective user must be recommended by an existing member to gain access. However, the COO, Marian Schikora, will review any new recommendation to ensure that the total number of members is kept low (for example, only a limited number of people per region can become members).

Internationalization 
The company is active in Germany, Austria, Switzerland, France, Sweden, Latvia, Netherlands, Slovenia, Italy, Ireland, Belgium and Romania. In addition, Best Secret GmbH acquired the Swiss online fashion retailer FashionFriends on April 1, 2016.

Investors 
In 2012, Schustermann & Borenstein sold two-thirds of its shares to Axa Private Equity Group (now Ardian), which included shares in Best Secret GmbH. The remaining shares remained family-owned by Daniel Schustermann, Emil Schustermann, Benno Borenstein and Daniel Borenstein, who continue to run the operating business.

In 2016, Ardian sold the Schustermann & Borenstein and BestSecret company shares to Permira. The enterprise value lay approximately between 700 and 750 million euro.

In 2020, Moritz Hahn (Zalando top Manager) joined Best Secret as a Co-CEO of the company.

Logistics Locations 
Best Secret warehouse moved to a new central warehouse in Poing near Munich in 2015. The size of the facility is 28,800 square meters and has a capacity of up to 4 million pieces of clothing.

Development Locations 
Best Secret development center are located in Granada and Munich.

Cargo Container Hardwood Beetle Incident 

In 2016, there was one incident in which nine employees were injured and another 51 had to seek medical treatment. The cause was based on two containers from China, which were provided with means that should avoid the import of Asian longhorn beetle. Employees complained of airborne contaminants that caused irritation to the eyes and respiratory tract. The product in question has been returned. The warehouse was put back into service the following day. Daniel Schustermann promised to introduce stricter security measures in the future to protect employees.

Awards 
2nd Place for Shopping Club in Online Retail – Test Bild  Beste Service Qualität 2017/18

References

External links 
 

2007 establishments in Germany
Online retailers of Germany
Mail-order retailers
Companies based in Upper Bavaria